Goranboy may refer to:

 Goranboy District, an administrative division of Azerbaijan
 Goranboy (city), a city in Azerbaijan
 Operation Goranboy, a military offensive in Goranboy Rayon